The Federal Road through the territory of the Creek people was a project that started in 1805 when the Creek gave permission for the development of a "horse path" through their nation for more efficient mail delivery between Washington City (modern-day Washington, D.C.) and New Orleans, Louisiana. This section started at Fort Wilkinson near Milledgeville, Georgia, and ended at Fort Stoddert near Mobile, Alabama. By the time of the War of 1812, the Federal Road began in Augusta, Georgia, ran through Fort Hawkins (in Macon, Georgia), on to Fort Mitchell, Alabama (near modern Phenix City, Alabama), and was connected via the Three Notch Road to Pensacola in Spanish West Florida.

The Federal Road was at first for mail delivery. It was widened into a war road during 1811, and used during the Creek War (1813–14). The result was removal of most of the Creek people to the West.

Another Federal Road (Cherokee lands) went from Savannah, Georgia through northern Georgia to Knoxville, Tennessee, and opened up Cherokee land for settlement.

See also
 
 
 National Road

References
 Southerland, Henry DeLeon Jr. and Brown, Jerry Elijah, "The Federal Road: Through Georgia, Creek Nation, and Alabama." The University of Alabama, 1989.

External links
 Federal Road in Alabama
 Federal Road
 Early Roads and Routes in Alabama: Digital Alabama
 Old Federal Road

Creek War
Historic trails and roads in Alabama
Historic trails and roads in Georgia (U.S. state)
1805 establishments in Georgia (U.S. state)